Sharks Stadium is a multi-use stadium in Port Harcourt, Nigeria. Part of the Alfred Diete-Spiff Rivers State sports complex, it is used mostly for football matches and is the home stadium of Sharks F.C. The stadium has a capacity of 5,000 people.

External links
Sharks FC swims in own waters soon...(Tide News)
Port Harcourt on fire (Sports Day)

Football venues in Nigeria
Sports venues in Port Harcourt